Aristide Bruant (6 May 1851 – 11 February 1925) was a French cabaret singer, comedian, and nightclub owner.  He is best known as the man in the red scarf and black cape featured on certain famous posters by Henri de Toulouse-Lautrec.  He has also been credited as the creator of the chanson réaliste musical genre.

Biography

Born Louis Armand Aristide Bruand in the village of Courtenay, Loiret in France, Bruant left his home in 1866 at age fifteen, following his father's death, to find employment. Making his way to the Montmartre Quarter of Paris, he hung out in the working-class bistros, where he finally was given an opportunity to show his musical talents. Although bourgeois by birth, he soon adopted the earthy language of his haunts, turning it into songs that told of the struggles of the poor.

Bruant began performing at cafe-concerts and developed a singing and comedy act that led to his being signed to appear at the Le Chat Noir club. Dressed in a red shirt, black velvet jacket, high boots, and a long red scarf, and using the stage name Aristide Bruant, he soon became a star of Montmartre, and when Henri de Toulouse-Lautrec began showing up at the cabarets and clubs, Bruant became one of the artist's first friends.

In 1885, Bruant opened his own Montmartre club, a place he called "Le Mirliton". Although he hired other acts, Bruant put on a singing performance of his own. As the master of ceremonies for the various acts, he used the comedy of the insult to poke fun at the club's upper-crust guests who were out "slumming" in Montmartre. His vaudeville-inspired mix of song, satire and entertainment developed into the musical genre called chanson réaliste (realist song).

Bruant died in Paris and was buried in Subligny's cemetery, near his birthplace in the departement of Loiret. Rue Bruant in Paris XIII arrondissement was named, not in Aristide's honor, but after the architect Libéral Bruant (1637-1697) whose church of the hospital Salpêtrière was built just north of the street.

Songs
Some of Bruant's better known songs include:

Nini Peau d'Chien
A la Bastille
A la Villette
Meunier tu es cocu
A Batignolles
Serrez Vos Rangs
A la Roquette
La chanson des Michetons
A Poissy
A la Place Maubert
Les petits joyeux
Belleville-Menilmontant
La Greviste
Le Chat Noir
Les Mômes de la Cloche

Popular culture

On Doctor Who, Tom Baker's trademark look as the Fourth Doctor was created by costume designer James Acheson, has said that he was trying to create a "bohemian" look for the character, and claimed he was unconsciously influenced by Lautrec's paintings of Bruant.
On Yakuza 3, Tokyo Kamurocho's Bantam Irish pub is decorated with Toulouse-Lautrec's paintings of Bruant.
In the poem 'Your Paris' (Birthday Letters), Ted Hughes mentions that Sylvia Plath "Called [him] Aristide Bruant".

References

External links
 
Toulouse-Lautrec in the Metropolitan Museum of Art, a full text exhibition catalog from The Metropolitan Museum of Art, which contains material on Aristide Bruant

1851 births
1925 deaths
19th-century French male singers
French comedians
Nightclub owners
People of Montmartre
People from Loiret